Meet the Hitlers is a 2014 documentary film about people around the world who share the name Hitler.  The executive producer of the film is Morgan Spurlock.

See also
Heath Hitler

References

External links
 

2014 films
Cultural depictions of Adolf Hitler
Biographical documentary films
Films directed by Morgan Spurlock
American documentary films
German documentary films
2010s English-language films
2010s American films
2010s German films